The Glass Peninsula is a peninsula extending southeast from Admiralty Island, between Seymour Canal and Stephens Passage, Southeast Alaska, United States. It was named by the United States Coast and Geodetic Survey for United States Navy Commander Henry Glass, who had made surveys in the area in 1881.

References

Peninsulas of Alaska
Landforms of Hoonah–Angoon Census Area, Alaska